The 1743 English cricket season was the 47th cricket season since the earliest recorded eleven-a-side match was played. Details have survived of 18 eleven-a-side and three single wicket matches.

Two paintings of cricket matches date from this year. The Cricket Match by Francis Hayman hangs at Lord's and depicts a game at the Artillery Ground and An Exact Representation of the Game of Cricket by Louis Philippe Boitard now hangs in the Tate Gallery.

Recorded matches 
Records have survived of ten significant matches:

Single wicket matches
A three-a-side game was played at the Artillery Ground on 11 July with six players who were stated to be "the best in England". They were William Hodsoll (Dartford), John Cutbush (Maidstone) and Val Romney (Sevenoaks) playing as Three of Kent; and Richard Newland (Slindon), William Sawyer (Richmond) and John Bryant (Bromley) playing as Three of All-England. Hodsoll and Newland were captains and Kent won by 2 runs. The London Evening Post says the crowd was computed to be 10,000". A return match was arranged at Sevenoaks Vine on Wednesday, 27 July but it did not take place.

A five a side game on Richmond Green between Five of Richmond and Five of London was played on 16 August and on 31 August a five-a-side match was plated Artillery Ground between Five of London and Five of Richmond.

Other events
A match at Finningham between teams from Finningham and Stradbroke in September is the earliest known reference to cricket in the county of Suffolk.

First mentions

Clubs and teams
 Addington
 Bromley & Chislehurst
 Deptford & Greenwich
 London, Middlesex & Surrey
 Berkshire, Buckinghamshire & Middlesex
 Kingston & Richmond
 Woburn

Players
 John Cutbush
 Robert Colchin
 Val Romney
 William Hodsoll
 Richard Newland
 William Sawyer

References

Bibliography

Further reading
 
 
 
 
 

1743 in English cricket
English cricket seasons in the 18th century